Dyshypostena edwardsi is a species of tachinid flies in the genus Dyshypostena of the family Tachinidae.

Distribution
Kenya

External links

Tachinidae
Insects described in 1960
Diptera of Africa